Nea Nikopoli is a community of the city of Kozani in northern Greece. Located north-west of the city centre, it has a population of 185 (2011).

References

Kozani
Populated places in Kozani (regional unit)